Moye is a commune in France.

Moye may refer to:

Other places 
 Moye Boarding House, a historic building in Portland, Tennessee
 Moye Complex, a football and lacrosse stadium at Mercer University

Other uses 
 Moye (name)